Eimear Nicholls née Mullan  (born 21 May 1982) Portstewart is an Irish professional triathlete who competes and wins Ironman competitions. She lives and trains in Scotland.

Life

Early career 
Before taking up the triathlon Eimear Mullan practiced at the tetrathlon. At university, she studied sports psychology. She graduated in 2007 as a physical education teacher and then she spent some time traveling. She then started to cycle as a sport and this led her to the triathlon. As an amateur, she had already won some national competitions at both sprint and distance.

Triathlon 
Eimear Mullan began her professional career in 2011. In 2012, she won Ironman UK in Bolton and the Ironman 70.3 in Somerset. She became the first Irish winner on Ironman and is the current Irish Ironman record holder with a time of 8.56.51 (Ironman Barcelona 2015). In 2013, she suspended her teaching career to devote herself fully to her sporting career and joined the TBB team where she was coached by Bella Bayliss and Brett Sutton. In 2014 after representing Northern Ireland at the Commonwealth games in Glasgow she went on to claim the top stop of the Embrunman podium in France. after a third place acquired the year before. In September 2014 she won a fourth victory at an XXL distance when she won the inaugural Ironman of Mallorca. She was elected Irish triathlete of the year in 2014. After a long injury break Eimear returned to racing in November’s 2017 with a victory at Ironman 70.3 Xiamen in China. She is now expecting her first child in September 2018 and has plans to return to professional racing in 2019.

Results

References

External links 
 Eimear Mullan official site

1982 births
Triathletes from Northern Ireland
People from Portstewart
Living people
Irish female triathletes
Irish expatriate sportspeople in Thailand
Sportspeople from County Londonderry
Triathletes at the 2014 Commonwealth Games
Commonwealth Games competitors for Northern Ireland